Surutti is a rāgam in Carnatic music (musical scale of South Indian classical music). It is the janya ragam of 28th Melakarta rāgam Harikambhoji in the 72 melakarta rāgam system. Subbarama Dikshitar classifies this a bhashanga raga. Its a Vakra raga (Zig-zag raga scale with seven notes in Arohana and nine in Avarohana)

Parent scale this raga is equalent to Khamaj thaat of Hindustani Music. The Janaka raga of this raga is known as Harikedāragowla in the Muthuswami Dikshitar school of music.

The notes of this raga is equivalent to Mixolydian mode of Western music but note order is zig-zag.

Structure and Lakshana 
Its  structure is as follows (see swaras in Carnatic music for details on below notation and terms):

 : 
 : 

(notes used in this scale are chatushruti rishabham, antara gandharam, shuddha madhyamam, panchamam chatushruti daivatam, kaishiki nishadham)

Notes

Compositions 
The Classical compositions in this rāgam

Film Songs

See also 
 List of Film Songs based on Ragas

References 

Janya ragas